Talk with Dmitry Medvedev is an annual special television program and a Q&A show broadcast - mostly live - by the television channels Russia-1, Russia 24, RT and Channel One Russia,  as well as by Mayak, Vesti FM and Radio of Russia radio stations. The Press Secretary Service of Medvedev (who has served as Prime Minister of the Russian Federation since 2012) supports and directs the broadcasts. The show runs once a year. During Medvedev's term as President of Russia (2008-2012) the show was called "Results of the Year with the President of Russia".

The Russian President Vladimir Putin features in an equivalent broadcast named Direct Line with Vladimir Putin.

Dmitry Medvedev
Russian television talk shows
2000s Russian television series
2010s Russian television series
2008 in Russian television
2008 Russian television series debuts
2015 Russian television series endings